Alnilam is the central star of Orion's Belt in the equatorial constellation of Orion. It has the Bayer designation ε Orionis, which is Latinised to Epsilon Orionis and abbreviated Epsilon Ori or ε Ori. This is a massive, blue supergiant star some 2,000 light-years distant. It is estimated to be 275,000 to 832,000 times as luminous as the Sun, and 40 to 44 times as massive.

Observation

It is the 29th-brightest star in the sky (the fourth brightest in Orion) and is a blue supergiant. Together with Mintaka and Alnitak, the three stars make up Orion's Belt, known by many names across many ancient cultures. Alnilam is the middle star.

Since 1943, the spectrum of this star has served as one of the stable anchor points by which other stars are classified, for the spectral class B0Ia.  Although the spectrum shows variations, particular in the H-alpha absorption lines, this is considered typical for this type of luminous hot supergiant. It is also one of the 58 stars used in celestial navigation. It is at its highest point in the sky around midnight on December 15. 

It is slightly variable from magnitude 1.64 to 1.74, with no clear period, and it is classified as an α Cygni variable.  Its spectrum also varies, possibly due to unpredictable changes in mass loss from the surface.

Physical characteristics

Estimates of Alnilam's properties vary. Analysis of the spectra and age of the members of the Orion OB1 association yields a mass 34.6 times that of the Sun ( on the main sequence) and an age of 5.7 million years.

A more recent detailed analysis of Alnilam across multiple wavelength bands produced very high luminosity, radius, and mass estimates, assuming the distance of 606 parsecs suggested by the Hipparcos new reduction. Adopting the larger parallax from the original Hipparcos reduction gives a distance of 412 parsecs and physical parameters more consistent with earlier publications.

Alnilam's relatively simple spectrum has made it useful for studying the interstellar medium. Within the next million years, this star may turn into a red supergiant and explode as a supernova. It is surrounded by a molecular cloud, NGC 1990, which it illuminates to make a reflection nebula. Its stellar winds may reach up to 2,000 km/s, causing it to lose mass about 20 million times more rapidly than the Sun.

Nomenclature and history 
ε Orionis is the star's Bayer designation and 46 Orionis its Flamsteed designation.

The traditional name Alnilam derives from the Arabic النظام al-niẓām 'arrangement/string (of pearls)'. Related spellings are Alnihan and Alnitam: all three variants are evidently mistakes in transliteration or copy errors, the first perhaps due to confusion with النيلم al-nilam 'sapphire'. In 2016, the International Astronomical Union organized a Working Group on Star Names (WGSN) to catalog and standardize proper names for stars. The WGSN's first bulletin of July 2016 included a table of the first two batches of names approved by the WGSN; which included Alnilam for this star. It is now so entered in the IAU Catalog of Star Names.

Orion's Belt

The three belt stars were collectively known by many names in many cultures. Arabic terms include Al Nijād ('the Belt'), Al Nasak ('the Line'), Al Alkāt ('the Golden Grains or Nuts') and, in modern Arabic, Al Mīzān al H•akk ('the Accurate Scale Beam'). In Chinese mythology, they were also known as the Weighing Beam. 

It is one of the western mansions of the White Tiger.

See also
List of most massive stars

References

External links
 

B-type supergiants
Alpha Cygni variables

Orion (constellation)
Orionis, Epsilon
1903
BD-01 0969
Orionis, 46
037128
026311
Alnilam
Stars named from the Arabic language